Jean Jennings is an American journalist, publisher and television personality covering the automotive industry, noted for making the industry more accessible to a broad cross-section of enthusiasts.

After writing for Car and Driver (1980-1985), she co-founded Automobile, where she continued to write her widely known column, Vile Gossip, after becoming the magazine's editor in chief (2000-2014) and president (2006-2014).

She was the automotive correspondent for Good Morning America (1994-2000) and the Oxygen network. She was later the Chairman, CEO and host of the self-branded automotive website and blog, Jean Knows Cars (2012-2018), has written articles for LinkedIn, and edited the book Road Trips, Head Trips, and Other Car-Crazed Writings. She continued to write the Vile Gossip column intermittently for Autoblog.com.

Jennings has been honored by the Motor Press Guild, International Society for Vehicle Preservation, and Detroit Press Club Foundation.  With Jennings as editor and President, Automobile magazine was the first car magazine to win a National Magazine Award.  She is in the Michigan Journalism Hall of Fame and won the Ken Purdy Award for Excellence in Automotive Journalism.

Background
Jennings grew up in a Catholic family with four brothers (also reported as five brothers) on a farm near New Baltimore, Michigan, the daughter of Audrey Jean Lienert (1924-2016, née Gagnon) and Robert Marcellus Lienert (1926-1988). Her father had a master's degree in journalism from Northwestern, was a copy editor at the Detroit Free Press, and later became the editor of Automotive News.

Having learned about cars from her father, Jennings recalled that he routinely brought home new and interesting cars for his work. He once took her, age 7, and two brothers for a test drive from their house in a brand new supercharged Studebaker Avanti — driving it inadvertently into a ditch at high speed but quickly recovering to the pavement before returning home, noting that their mother was not to hear the details of the test drive. Her oldest brother, Paul Lienert, became a noted automotive journalist, managing editor of AutoWeek, and a correspondent for Thomson Reuters.

At 14, Jennings was an exchange student in Ecuador where she learned to drive in a Toyota Land Cruiser in the Andes mountains. She attended St. Mary's Queen of Creation school from 1960 to 1970, and later attended the University of Michigan (1970-1972), dropping out after three incomplete semesters.

At eighteen, she became a taxi driver. She bought a used Plymouth Satellite with a 318 V-8 engine, painted it yellow, installed a roof light and a meter, and joined the Yellow Cab Company in Ann Arbor, Michigan, as an owner/operator. While there, she redefined the city taxicab boundaries, trained and created a training manual for new cab drivers, and was elected president of the Yellow Cab board. She married Tom Lindamood, a taxi dispatcher, in 1979. Five years later, with the taxi driving having become increasingly dangerous, Jennings became a driver at Chrysler's Chelsea Proving Grounds and later worked at Chrysler's Impact Lab, where she crashed cars, test drove cars, welded, and wrote for its award-winning union newsletter.

In 2014, Jennings co-founded the annual Caden's Car Show with C.S. Mott Children's Hospital, celebrating the life of eleven-year-old Caden Bowles, a car enthusiast who died while waiting for a heart transplant. Jennings has Type 2 Diabetes, sits on the board of directors of the Metro Detroit and Southeast Michigan chapter of the Juvenile Diabetes Research Foundation, and has emceed the organization's Promise Ball Gala.

In a 2016 interview, she counted as large influences on her life a Catholic upbringing "with a heavy emphasis on reading, Latin, and the pursuit of nothing less than perfection;" a disruptive bent brought out by working on an underground newspaper; and a heavy desire to escape her dirt-road, middle-of-nowhere childhood, the latter facilitated by learning to drive at an early age.

She now lives on a dirt road in the middle of nowhere (in Michigan) with her husband, Tim Jennings.

Career
In 1980, at her brother Paul's encouragement, one month after she was laid off at Chrysler, she applied at Car and Driver and was hired as a staff writer by editor David E. Davis (1930–2011). Though she considers herself a poor automotive prognosticator, in the November 1984 issue of Car and Driver, she presciently ended her Oldsmobile Calais review, "won't it be embarrassing if, twenty years hence, the division goes under because all its customers have died?" The division folded sixteen years later, in 2000.

In 1985 she left Car and Driver with Davis, co-founding Automobile magazine and becoming its first executive editor. Under the motto "No Boring Cars," the magazine competed directly with three other successful automotive magazines, Motor Trend, Car and Driver and Road & Track — with a decidedly more upscale, high style, high-profile focus, heavier stock paper and the only one of the four to be perfect bound (not stapled) — with lush, four-color printed photography and ground-breaking art direction. Within a year, the other three major car magazines changed to perfect binding and full color printing, hiring new editors and art directors as well. She became Editor-in-Chief in 2000 at Automobile, and President in 2006.

At Automobile, Jennings became known for her automotive adventures with some of the most prominent and important people in and out of automotive culture. She spent 9,000 miles in the first of Brock Yates' One Lap of America with Parnelli Jones in a panel van disguised as a Stroh's Brewery truck; was close to auto writer and racer Denise McCluggage for 30 years; mooned race car drivers Dan Gurney and Phil Hill; drove to the top of the world with Swedish rally driver Erik Carlsson; spent a day in 1990 and drank Johnnie Walker Red with Porsche design chief Tony Lapine and 90-year old champion Bugatti driver Eliška Junková (Elizabeth Junek) at her apartment in the Swedish embassy in Prague, just after the Berlin Wall fell; rode motorcycles across China with Malcolm Smith; followed the Camel Trophy in Madagascar; raced in Baja with a Russian circle-track driver; navigated in the 2000-mile Pirelli-Classic Marathon vintage rally in a 1965 MGB across the Alps with Stirling Moss; and in 1983 drove a yellow prototype C4 Corvette with Chuck Yeager.

She would later say she had a "desire to pursue adventures around the country and the globe, even as [David E. Davis] remained dismayed by my inelegance... I thrived because I could tell a story."

Unabashed and outspoken, Jennings became an undercover spokesmodel at the 1988 North American International Auto Show, reciting a memorized sales pitch for the Eagle Premier — wearing a copper lamé gown, heavily teased hair and such heavily glamorized makeup she was left largely unrecognizable. In 1988, at Good Morning America she startled Diane Sawyer, live on air, after calling the new Chevrolet SSR, "bitchin", explaining to the clearly ruffled Sawyer that it was an acceptable California hot-rodding term. She taught an Oprah Winfrey Show audience how to change a tire and jump start a car.

Jennings was periodically estranged from Davis, whom she described on his death in 2011 as "the most interesting, most difficult, cleverest, darkest, most erudite, dandiest, and most inspirational, charismatic and all-around damnedest human being I will ever meet. I have loved him. I have seriously not loved him."  For his part, Davis claimed on a televised show to have dreamt of a "FedEx plane dropping a grand piano over [Jennings'] house, with the aftermath being splinters and a grease spot where [she] had been standing."

Jennings was profiled by Susan Orlean for The New Yorker, appeared on The Tonight Show with Jay Leno, and has been a regular on-air contributor, including on Fox Business Network; CNBC's Closing Bell, Squawk Box, Behind the Wheel, and Power Lunch; MSNBC; CBS's This Morning and Evening News; and CNN's American Morning and Headline News.

In 2014, she was a judge for the ten-episode, Chevrolet-sponsored reality show Motor City Masters, which highlighted car-based design challenges.

In 2012, while still with Automobile, Jennings founded a self-branded website and blog, Jean Knows Cars, with the backing of Automobiles owner, Source Interlink, online and in 18 newspapers nationally. Source Interlink reshuffled its holdings in 2014, letting go of Jennings as Editor in Chief at Automobile and firing 90% of its staff. Her website and blog remained active until about 2018.

She continues to write and podcast with Autoblog.

Awards and recognition
Jennings received the 2016 New England Motor Press Association's Lifetime Achievement Award; the Motor Press Guild 2016 Lifetime Achievement Award and the 2007 International Motor Press Association annual Ken Purdy award for Excellence in Automotive Journalism for her June 2006 Automobile cover story, "Veyron in the USA."

References

External links
JeanKnowsCars.com

Motoring journalists
Women magazine editors
American columnists
American magazine editors
American women essayists
21st-century American journalists
20th-century American journalists
American magazine founders
American magazine publishers (people)
People in the automobile industry
American bloggers
American essayists
American women bloggers
Living people
Writers from Michigan
Television personalities from Michigan
American reporters and correspondents
Place of birth missing (living people)
Year of birth missing (living people)
20th-century American women
21st-century American women